is a Japanese guitar brand owned by Hoshino Gakki. Based in Nagoya, Aichi, Japan, Hoshino Gakki were one of the first Japanese musical instrument companies to gain a significant foothold in import guitar sales in the United States and Europe, as well as the first brand of guitars to mass-produce the seven-string guitar and eight-string guitar. Ibanez manufactures effects, accessories, amps, and instruments in Japan, China, Indonesia and in the United States (at a Los Angeles-based custom shop).  they marketed nearly 165 models of bass guitar, 130 acoustic guitars, and more than 300 electric guitars. After Gibson and Fender, Ibanez is considered the third biggest guitar brand.

History

The Hoshino Gakki company began in 1908 as the musical instrument sales division of the Hoshino Shoten, a bookstore chain.  Hoshino Gakki decided in 1935 to make Spanish-style acoustic guitars, at first using the "Ibanez Salvador" brand name in honor of Spanish luthier Salvador Ibáñez, and later simply "Ibanez". Accordingly, the brand originally was spelled  in Japan, reflecting the Spanish pronunciation, before changing its spelling in 1986 to the current name, which represents an English pronunciation of Ibanez.

The modern era of Ibanez guitars began in 1957. The late 1950s and 1960s Ibanez catalogues show guitars with some wild-looking designs, manufactured by Kiso Suzuki Violin, Guyatone, and their own Tama factory established in 1962.    After the Tama factory stopped manufacturing guitars in 1966, Hoshino Gakki used the Teisco and FujiGen Gakki guitar factories to make Ibanez guitars, and after the Teisco String Instrument factory closed in 1969/1970, Hoshino Gakki used the FujiGen Gakki guitar factory to make Ibanez guitars.

In the 1960s, Japanese guitar makers mainly copied American guitar designs, and Ibanez-branded copies of Gibson, Fender, and Rickenbacker models appear. This resulted in the so-called lawsuit period.

Hoshino Gakki introduced Ibanez models that were definitely not copies of the Gibson or Fender designs, such as the Iceman and the Roadstar series. The company has produced its own guitar designs ever since. The late 1980s and early 1990s were an important period for the Ibanez brand. Hoshino Gakki's relationship with guitarist Steve Vai resulted in the introduction of the Ibanez JEM and the Ibanez Universe models; after the earlier successes of the Roadstar and Iceman models in the late 1970s – early 1980s, Hoshino Gakki entered the superstrat market with the RG series, a lower-priced version of their JEM series.

Hoshino Gakki also had semi-acoustic, nylon- and steel-stringed acoustic guitars manufactured under the Ibanez name. Most Ibanez guitars were made by the FujiGen guitar factory in Japan up until the mid- to late 1980s, and from then on Ibanez guitars have also been made in other Asian countries such as Korea, China, and Indonesia. During the early 1980s, the FujiGen guitar factory also produced most of the Roland guitar synthesizers, including the Stratocaster-style Roland G-505, the twin-humbucker Roland G-202 (endorsed by Adrian Belew, Eric Clapton, Dean Brown, Jeff Baxter, Yannis Spathas, Christoforos Krokidis, Steve Howe, Mike Rutherford, Andy Summers, Neal Schon and Steve Hackett) and the Ibanez X-ING IMG-2010.

Cimar and Starfield were guitar and bass brands owned by Hoshino Gakki. In the 1970s, Hoshino Gakki and Kanda Shokai shared some guitar designs, and so some Ibanez and Greco guitars have the same features. The Greco versions were sold in Japan and the Ibanez versions were sold outside Japan. From 1982, Ibanez guitars have also been sold in Japan as well.

Guitar brands such as Antoria and Mann shared some Ibanez guitar designs. The Antoria guitar brand was managed by JT Coppock Leeds Ltd England. CSL was a brand name managed by Charles Summerfield Ltd England. Maurice Summerfield of the Charles Summerfield Ltd company contributed some design ideas to Hoshino Gakki and also imported Ibanez and CSL guitars into the UK from 1964 to 1987. The Maxxas brand name came about because Hoshino Gakki thought that the guitar did not fit in with the Ibanez model range and was therefore named Maxxas by Rich Lasner from Hoshino USA.

The "lawsuit" guitars

Harry Rosenbloom, founder of the (now-closed) Medley Music of Bryn Mawr, Pennsylvania, was manufacturing handmade guitars under the name "Elger". By 1965, Rosenbloom had decided to stop manufacturing guitars and chose to become the exclusive North American distributor for Ibanez guitars. In September 1972, Hoshino began a partnership with Elger Guitars to import guitars from Japan.  In September 1981, Elger was renamed "Hoshino U.S.A.", retaining the company headquarters in Bensalem, Pennsylvania as a distribution and quality-control center.

On  June 28, 1977, in the Philadelphia Federal District Court, a lawsuit was filed by the Norlin Corporation, the parent company of Gibson Guitars, against Elger/Hoshino U.S.A.'s use of the Gibson headstock design and logo. Hoshino settled out of court in early 1978 and the case was officially closed on February 2, 1978.

After the lawsuit, Hoshino Gakki abandoned the strategy of copying "classic" electric guitar designs, having already introduced a plethora of original designs. Hoshino was producing their original Artist models from 1974, introducing a set-neck model in 1975. In 1977, they upgraded and extended their Artist range and introduced a number of other top-quality original designs made to match or surpass famous American brands: the Performer and short-lived Concert ranges, which competed with the Les Paul; through-neck Musicians; Studios in fixed- and through-neck construction; the radically shaped Iceman; and the Roadster which morphed into the Roadstar range, precursor to the popular superstrat era in the mid-1980s. The newer Ibanez models began incorporating more modern elements into their design such as radical body shapes, slimmer necks, 2-octave fingerboards, slim pointed headstocks, higher-output electronics, humbucker/single-coil/humbucker (H/S/H) pickup configurations, locking tremolo bridges and different finishes.

Guitars

Sub-brands
Ibanez J. Custom
The J. Custom series are the most exclusive and expensive guitars Ibanez offers. They are "envisioned to be the finest Japanese-made guitar in history". Built by some of the most skilled luthiers in Japan, they "represent every advance in design and technology Ibanez has developed over the last 20 years". As of 2022, they feature aftermarket pickups of the Dimarzio brand (DiMarzio® Air Norton™, DiMarzio® True Velvet™, DiMarzio® The Tone Zone® and DiMarzio® PAF® 7), 5 piece maple/wenge necks with Titanium reinforcement rods, ebony fingerboard with a tree of life fret board inlay, and Edge Zero tremolo systems. Even among J. Customs there are two tiers: most of the standard production J. Customs (the ones that appear in catalogs) are produced by FujiGen Gakki while the more limited production models are produced by Sugi Guitars. The Sugi-made models are typically produced in very limited numbers from one-offs to maybe a dozen copies of a single design.

Ibanez Prestige
The Prestige guitars are Ibanez's top-of-the-line models that are built in Japan. They feature higher quality materials, high craftsmanship, and higher quality bridges compared to other models.

Ibanez Premium
The Premium guitars are similar to other models but are built in Ibanez's Indonesian premium factory to premium quality standards.

Ibanez Gio
The Ibanez Gio are Ibanez' budget guitars, designed for high playability at low costs. Many high end Ibanez guitars are recreated in the more affordable Gio form, such as the RGA and ART models.

U.S.A. custom 
USA custom range. Late 1980s to mid-1990s. Also known as Ibanez LACS (L.A. Custom Shop), services only their endorsed artists today.

Solid body electric guitars
Ibanez RG
 The main characteristics that are common among all Ibanez RG guitars (RG stands for Roadstar Guitar) are that they feature 24 frets and use thin necks, known as "Wizard", which allows for faster playing. The RG features a line up of guitars with both floating tremolo systems and fixed bridge systems. 
Ibanez RGA
The Ibanez RGA was introduced at a time when the Ibanez RG series only had tremolo bridges. Since then, the RG series has introduced fixed bridge models, but Ibanez still produces the RGA series with an arched top to differentiate from the RG series. The arched top allows for added comfort while playing the guitar.
Ibanez RGD
The Ibanez RGD guitar was developed for heavy metal guitar players. The RGD features a 26.5" scale which allows for lower than standard guitar tuning while retaining standard string tension without use of thicker gauge strings. It also features an extra deep scoop cut on the lower horn for easy high fret access. Ibanez currently makes two Ibanez RGD Prestige models.
Ibanez S
The Ibanez S (Saber) guitar has an extremely thin body made out of mahogany, and is available in 6, 7 and 8-string models. They may come with either 22 or 24 frets, depending on year of manufacture. The standard line currently have Wizard III necks that are slightly wider and thicker than the original Wizard. All S models have bodies that are thicker in the middle where the pickups are, and taper off towards the outer edges. The guitars use ZR (Zero Resistance), Lo-TRS, and variants of the Edge bridge system as well as fixed bridges. Ibanez currently makes 8 Prestige S-Series guitars.
Ibanez DN
The Ibanez DN guitar (DN stands for Darkstone) was developed for heavy metal guitar players. The main features of the DN are that it has a set-in neck for speed and playing comfort, medium frets, and coil tapped pickups. This guitar is currently discontinued.
Ibanez X
The Ibanez X guitars are Ibanez guitars that feature unconventional and unique body designs. An example would be the Ibanez Xiphos, which is stylized to look like the letter X. For all X guitars currently available and for more information, check the Ibanez Electric Guitar page in 2013.  (as of 2013, variations may be: Halberd XH300 and Glaive XG300, Mick Thomson Signature MTM100, MTM10)
Ibanez Artist (AR)
The Ibanez Artist guitars were designed for heavy playing such as for heavy metal or traditional rock. The Artist ARZ is a single cutaway, 24 fret, 25" scale guitar that features a wide variety of bridges and pickups depending on the specific models. The Artist ART is a single cutaway, 22 fret, 24.75" scale guitar that features a hard tail bridge. The Ibanez AR is a reissued series originating from the 70s. The AR series features a set-in neck, double cutaway, with 22 frets on a 24.75" scale.
Ibanez FR
The Ibanez FR is a simple body type guitar that is designed to be played in many genres.
Ibanez Mikro
The Ibanez Mikro series are small form factor guitars designed for children, beginners, or guitar players looking for a guitar that is easy to transport.

Hollow body electric guitars
Ibanez Artcore series
The first Ibanez Artcore models were released in mid-2002 whose goal was to offer an affordable range of full-hollow and semi-hollow body guitars that appealed to entry level guitarists who were unable or unwilling to pay big money on high-priced guitars.
Ibanez Artcore Custom
 The Artcore Custom is Ibanez's flagship model for the Artcore series. The bodies of the guitars are made of maple, the neck has a set-in construction type, and features wood control knobs and hand rolled frets.
Ibanez AK
The Ibanez AK is a guitar designed for jazz and blues type playing. It features a slim set-in neck with a body designed to easily access the higher frets. The AK is easily distinguishable by its sharper lower body horn (Florentine cutaway ?) that other Artcore guitars do not have.

Production signature guitars

 JEM , Universe and Pia Series – Steve Vai Signature
 JS – Joe Satriani Signature
 PGM – Paul Gilbert Signature
 APEX – Munky Signature
 E-Gen – Herman Li Signature
 NDM4 – Noodles Signature
 PWM - Paul Waggoner Signature
 KIKO - Kiko Loureiro Signature
 STM2 – Sam Totman Signature
 ORM – Omar Rodriguez Signature
 MBM – Matt Bachand Signature
 HRG – H. R. Giger Signature
 GB – George Benson Signature
 K7 – Head and Munky Signature
 PM – Pat Metheny Signature
 PS10 – Paul Stanley Signature
 JSM – John Scofield Signature
 AT – Andy Timmons Signature
 TAM - Tosin Abasi Signature
 RBM - Reb Beach Signature
 JBM - Jake Bowen Signature
 BBM - Ben Bruce Signature
 JIVA - Nita Strauss Signature
 THBB - Tim Henson Signature
 SLM - Scott LePage Signature
 MAR - Mario Camarena Signature
 EH - Erick Hansel Signature
 YY - Yvette Young Signature
 M8M - Mårten Hagström Signature
 FTM - Fredrik Thordendal Signature
 ICHI - Ichika Nito Signature
 LB - Lari Basilio Signature

Discontinued guitars

 Ibanez R series, also known as the Radius series, are famous for having lightweight aerofoil-profiled basswood bodies. The main endorser was Joe Satriani before he was given his own Signature JS series. The Radius series is now discontinued.
 RT series – Superstrat design with 24 frets. Discontinued in 1994.
 RX series – Superstrat design but with 22 frets instead. Discontinued in 1998, and currently only exists as GRX (budget model of RX series).

 Axstar (a.k.a. Axstar by Ibanez) – discontinued
 EDR/EXR – Ergodyne series – discontinued
 MC – Musician series – Discontinued – Neck-through construction (except for MC-100, which has a bolt-on neck), with 24 frets (two octaves) – As with the Artist models of the late 1970s, some of these guitars were equipped with trisound switches, and some models (MC 400 and MC 500) were equipped with active electronics.
 ST – Studio series 1977–82 offset double cutaway ranging from bolt on to fixed  and through necks with pairs of V2 distortion humbuckers. 24 frets and 25.5" scale.
 CN – Concert range 1977–79 like a bolt on neck Artist with slightly offset cutaways.
 IC – Iceman a radical shape endorsed and used by Paul Stanley, Various pickup combinations.
 SB70 – Studio & Blazer spot build: Mixing Studio series double cutaway, ash bodies with Blazer series 21 fret bolt on maple necks, and sporting a fixed brass bridge, 2 Super 70 Humbuckers, 1 vol, 2 tone knobs, a pickup selector switch, and a phase mini-toggle switch (which gives a unique strat-like quack sound), an estimated 300-400 of these were assembled, mostly in 1982.  A cult following has emerged, as these guitars are rare, and sell for 3x-4x their original price. Learn more at The Unofficial SB70 Registry: https://www.ibanezcollectors.com/forum/index.php?topic=20623.0
 BL – Blazer series 1980–82 – fixed bridge strat-like with maple necks and mahogany or ash bodies sporting 3 single coil pickups (Super 6 or BL) or 2 Super 70 humbuckers.
 ARC-100/300 (Retro Series)
 ARX-100/300 (Retro Series)
 AR-100/200 (black vintage top)
 V Series – Flying V's – discontinued
 Ibanez Artcore Series – Ibanez's full and semi-hollow guitar line, with some models discontinued since their debut in 2002.
 Ibanez Jet King 2 and Jet King 1 – A modern remake of the Ibanez Rhythm maker, vintage looking and sounding guitars.
 Radius series – discontinued, a modified version is now taken over by the Joe Satriani signature series which features a multi-radius neck.
 EX Series – Manufactured in Korea and Japan (rare).
 PL – Pro Line series
 RR – Rocket Roll
 DT – Destroyer
 IC – Iceman
 Talman Series – discontinued
 CN Concert Series – This was a short lived series produced in 1978 then discontinued soon afterwards. It features an asymmetric double cutaway body with two humbuckers, a hard tail bridge and a bolt on neck. The top end model (the CN250) was one of the earliest guitars to feature "half vine" fingerboard inlays.
 Power II series (540PII) - extended length lower cutaway, wide (1 3/4")nut,available in H-H or H-S with edge trem. Often erroneously assumed to be an Alex Skolnick signature model due to his picture in the 88-89 catalogue with a 540PII. Primarily released for the Japanese market, although it has the Bensalem Penn. neck plate.
 AFD – Artfield
 GR – Ghostrider series, arched-top double cutaway design. 24" scale length. Most notably played by Shawn Lane.
 Cimar by Ibanez

 ICJ100WZ – Jay Yuenger Signature
 K7 – Korn Signature
 Stanley Jordan Signature
 AH10 – Allan Holdsworth Signature
 LR10 – Lee Ritenour Signature
 JP20 – Joe Pass Signature
 MFM – Marty Friedman Signature
 MTM – Mick Thomson Signature
 VM1 – Vinnie Moore Signature
 FGM – Frank Gambale Signature
 JPM – John Petrucci Signature
 RBM2NT – Reb Beach Signature
 DMM1 – Daron Malakian Signature
 MMM – Mike Mushok Signature
 RS1010SL – Steve Lukather Signature
 STM1 – Sam Totman Signature
 NDM1 and NDM2 – Noodles Signature

Bass guitar models
SR (Soundgear) Series
Middle-class model range in the new millennium, though it included expensive high-end and top-of-the-line Japanese models in the late 1980s and 1990s. Later top offerings were branded as Signature and SR Prestige models for clearer segmentation, and all non-Prestige model production moved outside Japan.  Current models from the SR250 and up feature soap bar-style humbuckers with active EQ.
SR Prestige
High-end versions of the Ibanez Soundgear (SR-5004/5/6 & SR-4004/5/6) Bass Guitars made in Japan using exotic woods and high-quality custom Bartolini pickups & new "PWC-III" Power Curve III 3-band EQ with EQ bypass switch to bypass the electronics and take the bass signal directly from the pickups to the output jack. All Japanese-built current production models are in the Prestige series.
SR Premium
Nordstrand pickups.  Indonesian-built.

 AFFIRMA series - solidbody basses designed by Rolf Spuler and made in Japan 
 AFR - set neck, one magnetic pickup, and a piezo bridge 
 Original series was launched in the early 1990's, a reissue series was released 2020 
 ARTCORE Series- Archtop Basses
 ARTIST (Model 2626B - Carved-top solid-body set-neck bass, twin humbuckers, made late Seventies.)
 AFB200 – Hollow-body bass guitar
 AGB200 – Semihollow-body bass guitar
 ATK Series
 ATK 300 4 string model
 ATK 305 5 string model
 ATK 1200, the Prestige version of the standard ATK, has extra neck pickup
 ATK 800E, to be released in 2012, a Premium version of the standard ATK. Has extra neck pickup
 ATK 805E, to be released in 2012, a Premium version of the standard ATK. Has extra neck pickup, 5-string model
 Blazer
 BTB (Boutique Bass) Series
 BTB 400QM (discontinued)
 BTB 406QM (Special Edition 6 String Model)
 BTB Prestige – High-end range which are made in Japan.
 BTB Iron Label Standard
 BTB Iron Label Multiscale
Ergodyne Series - Bodies made from Luthite polymer.
 EDA Series
 EDB Series
 EDC Series
 EWB Series
 GARTB 20
 GATK 20 – More affordable version of the ATK.
 GAXB Series (discontinued)
 GSR Series- A lower-cost version of the Soundgear Series
 GSR 100 – The original GSR bass guitar (Discontinued)
 GSR 100 EX
 GSR 105 EX
 GSR 180
 GSRM 20
 GSR 250 M
 GSR 200
 GSR 200 FM – The GSR but with different color designs such as sunburst.
 GSR 205 – Nominated for Ibanez's "Best of Model" award
 GSR 205 FM
 ICB (Iceman) Series
 JTK (Jet King) Series
 JUMPSTART Series- Similar to the GSR Series, named for the Jumpstart Pack which comes with amp and other accessories.
 Musician Series
 ROADGEAR Series
 SRX (Soundgear) Series
 EX series
 Roadstar Series
 S series
 STUDIO series - Late Seventies bolt-on neck alternative to the Musician series. Included an 8-string bass.
 TR Series

Signature basses
K5 Fieldy
A custom 5-string Soundgear design w/ "K5" Inlay centered on 12th fret. It was based around a late-1990s then-top-of-the-line Soundgear SR885 owned by the artist, retaining the shape and electronics, but with different colour options and a change of woods to suit his preferences. Early models were Japanese-built, but production later moved to other Asian countries, around the same time Japanese models were rebranded with the Prestige moniker and positioned as the absolute top of the line.

 SDB – Sharlee D'Angelo Signature bass
 PRB – Paul Romanko Signature bass
 GWB – Gary Willis Signature bass
 MDB – Mike D'Antonio Signature bass
 DTB – Dionald Tubang Signature bass
 GVB - Gerald Veasley Signature bass
 VWB1 – Verdine White Signature bass (discontinued)
 PGB - Paul Gray Signature and Tribute bass (discontinued)
 DWB - Doug Wimbish Series

Acoustic guitar models

 AE Series
AE5LG
 AEL Series
 AES Series
 DT Series
 EP9 Series
 EW Series
 GA Series
 JAMPACK Series
 MANDOLIN Series
 MANN Series (Canadian distribution only)
 MASA Series
 PF Series
 PC series
 TALMAN Series
 V Series
 Concord
 SAGE Series
 A300AVV acoustic/electric single cutaway (Ambiance series)

Amplifiers

Guitar amplifiers

 IBZ
IBZ15GR
IBZ10G
 TBX Tone Blaster Series 
 TSA
 TSA15/TSA15H
 TSA30/TSA30H

Bass amplifiers

 Promethean
 IBZ
 Sound Wave

Acoustic amplifiers

 Troubadour

Effect pedals

In the 1970s, the Nisshin Onpa company who owned the Maxon brand name, developed and began selling a series of effect pedals in Japan. Hoshino Gakki licensed these for sale using the name Ibanez outside Japan. These two companies eventually began doing less and less business together until Nisshin Onpa ceased manufacturing the TS-9 reissue for Hoshino Gakki in 2002.

*ToneLok Series
AP7 Analog Phaser
AW7 Autowah
CF7 Stereo Chorus/Flanger
DE7 Stereo Delay/Echo
DS7 Distortion
FZ7 Fuzz
LF7 Lo-Fi
PD7 Phat Hed Bass Overdrive
SB7 Synthesizer Bass
SH7 Seventh Heaven
SM7 Smashbox
TC7 Tri Mode Chorus
TS7 Tube Screamer
WD7 Weeping Demon
WD7JR Weeping Demon Junior

8 Series
AD-80 Analog Delay 1979-1981
TS808 Tube Screamer 1979 - 1981

 9 series 
AD9 Analog Delay
AF9 Auto Filter
BB9 Bottom Booster
BC9 Bi-Mode Chorus
CP9 Compressor/Limiter
CS9 Stereo Chorus
FL9 Flanger
GE9 Graphic EQ
JD9 Jet Driver
OD9 Overdrive
PQ9 Parametric EQ
PT9 Phaser
SD9 Sonic Distortion
SM9 Super Metal
ST9 Super Tube Screamer
TS9 Tube Screamer
TS9B Bass Tube Screamer
TS9DX Turbo Tube Screamer
TS930TH 30th Anniversary Tube Screamer
Wah Pedals
WD7
WH10V3

Ibanez endorsers: past and present

Serial numbers

References

Models

Bibliography

External links

 

Musical instruments brands
Japanese brands
Guitar manufacturing companies
Guitar amplifier manufacturers
Guitar effects manufacturing companies
Manufacturing companies established in 1929
Manufacturing companies based in Nagoya
Musical instrument manufacturing companies of Japan
Japanese companies established in 1929
Audio equipment manufacturers of Japan
Mandolin makers